The Village of Golf is a village in Palm Beach County, Florida, United States. As of 2018, the population recorded by the U.S. Census Bureau was 275.

History

Golf was founded in the 1950s as a planned community on a golf course. As some of the early settlers were originally from Golf, Illinois this was their preference for a name. The village was incorporated in 1957.

Geography

Village of Golf is located at  (26.504264, –80.104759).

Demographics

2020 census

As of the 2020 United States census, there were 255 people, 111 households, and 86 families residing in the village.

2000 census
At the 2000 census there were 230 people, 119 households, and 84 families in the village. The racial makeup of the village was 97.39% White, 0.87% African American, 1.74% from other races. Hispanic or Latino of any race were 2.17%.

Of the 119 households 9.2% had children under the age of 18 living with them, 68.1% were married couples living together, 1.7% had a female householder with no husband present, and 29.4% were non-families. 28.6% of households were one person and 26.1% were one person aged 65 or older.  The average household size was 1.93 and the average family size was 2.31.

The age distribution was 9.1% under the age of 18, 2.6% from 18 to 24, 6.1% from 25 to 44, 27.0% from 45 to 64, and 55.2% 65 or older.  The median age was 67 years. For every 100 females, there were 91.7 males.  For every 100 females age 18 and over, there were 88.3 males.

The median household income was in excess of $200,000, as is the median family income . Males had a median income of over $100,000 versus $50,833 for females. The per capita income for the village was $144,956.  None of the families and 1.7% of the population were below the poverty line. No one under 18 below poverty, and 3.4% of those 65 and older were living below the poverty line.

As of 2000, English as a first language accounted for 100% of the population. It, as well as Briny Breezes, Cloud Lake, and Jupiter Inlet Colony were the only municipalities in Palm Beach county with all residents having the mother tongue of English.

References

External links
 Village of Golf  Official Website

Villages in Palm Beach County, Florida
Villages in Florida